Mount Robertson is a mountain in the Canadian Rockies, standing astride the British Columbia-Alberta boundary between Palliser Pass and North Kananaskis Pass. The British Columbia side of the pass is in Mount Assiniboine Provincial Park. The mountain is named for Sir William Robertson (1860–1933), 1st Baronet, Chief of the Imperial General Staff from 1916 to 1918 during the First World War.

Geology

Mount Robertson is composed of sedimentary rock laid down during the Precambrian to Jurassic periods. Formed in shallow seas, this sedimentary rock was pushed east and over the top of younger rock during the Laramide orogeny.  The Haig Glacier, largest singular glacier in Kananaskis Country, lies to the south of the peak.

Climate

Based on the Köppen climate classification, Mount Robertson is located in a subarctic climate with cold, snowy winters, and mild summers.

See also
 List of peaks on the Alberta–British Columbia border
 List of mountains in the Canadian Rockies

References

Notes

Three-thousanders of British Columbia
Three-thousanders of Alberta
Canadian Rockies